Bukhnag is a rural locality (a selo) in Khalagsky Selsoviet, Tabasaransky District, Republic of Dagestan, Russia. The population was 194 as of 2010.

Geography 
Bukhnag is located 19 km southwest of Khuchni (the district's administrative centre) by road. Khalag is the nearest rural locality.

References 

Rural localities in Tabasaransky District